The Cornell Club of New York, usually referred to as The Cornell Club, is a private club in Midtown Manhattan, New York City. Its membership is restricted to alumni and faculty of Cornell University, family of Cornellians, business associates of Members, and graduates of The Club's affiliate schools.

The Cornell Club's clubhouse is a fourteen-story building located at 6 East 44th Street between Madison Avenue and Fifth Avenue.

History

In 1889, the first Cornell Club was formed by Cornell University graduates.  The current 14-story clubhouse located in midtown Manhattan at 6 East 44th Street was formerly the offices of the Chicago Pneumatic Tool Company. The building was a gift to the University and was renovated by the firm of Gensler & Associates of San Francisco, CA.  The clubhouse opened its doors on December 1, 1989.

Past Locations:
 1900 The Royalton Apartment Hotel on West 44th Street
 1901 65 Park Avenue, and Madison Avenue at 38th Street
 1939 The Hotel Barclay (now the Inter-Continental) at 48th Street
 1962 50th Street at 3rd Avenue
 1982 The Women's National Headquarters, and NYU's Town Hall facility

The clubhouse was established on Clubhouse Row, where many of New York City's other clubs are located, such as the Harvard Club of New York at 27 West 44th, Penn Club of New York at 30 West 44th, and New York Yacht Club at 37 West 44th on the same block, and a block away from The Yale Club of New York City on East 44th (and Vanderbilt) and Princeton Club of New York at 15 West 43rd for inter-club events. Despite being in New York City, the Columbia University Club of New York shares a clubhouse with the Penn Club, while Dartmouth shares with the Yale Club and Brown shares the Cornell Club.

Membership and benefits
Membership in the Cornell Club is restricted to alumni, faculty, and students of Cornell University along with alumni of a short list of ten affiliated schools: Brown, Colgate, Duke, Georgetown, Notre Dame, Rensselaer Polytechnic Institute, Stanford, Trinity College Dublin, Tulane, and Wake Forest. Most members are alumni of Cornell University.

All members enjoy full use of the clubhouse facilities and its services, except for the Health & Fitness Center, for which the Club charges additional fees. The Club includes a bar, The Big Red Tap & Grill, and a restaurant, The Cayuga Room. In addition, the Club has four banquet/meeting rooms, a business center, 48 overnight guest rooms, and a library. Members may use the squash courts at the Yale Club of New York City.

Dues are on a sliding scale, based on age and proximity to the Club. Like most private clubs, members of the Club are given reciprocal benefits at clubs around the United States and the world.

See also
Columbia University Club of New York
Harvard Club of Boston
Harvard Club of New York
List of American gentlemen's clubs
Penn Club of New York City
Princeton Club of New York
Yale Club of New York City

Footnotes

External links

 

Clubs and societies in New York City
Cornell University
Culture of Manhattan
Gentlemen's clubs in New York City
Midtown Manhattan
Organizations established in 1889